Bandringa is an extinct genus of Elasmobranch known from the Pennsylvanian subperiod of the Carboniferous period that was part of the monotypic family Bandringidae. There is currently a single known species, B. rayi, described in 1969. It is known from exceptionally preserved individuals found in the Mazon Creek Lagerstätte of Illinois which dates back to the late Moscovian stage.

Discovery and naming 
The holotype (PF 5686), a juvenile, was found by Ray Bandringa in an ironstone concretion in Illinois during the summer of 1967. By 1979, two species from this genus were originally described, B. rayi and B. herdinae, but the differences between the two were found to be taphonomic in origin. All Mazon Creek individuals appear to represent juveniles, suggesting the area was a nursery for them. Also supporting this notion are fossilized egg cases found in the same localities, though it is unclear whether they belong to this genus. Adult fossils attributed to B. rayi have also been found in spoil heaps from Five Points coal mines near Conesville, Ohio and Cannelton, Pennsylvania, both of which contain the roughly contemporaneous Kittaning Formation of the Allegheny Group.

Description
Bandringa was a unique looking fish. The most noticeable part of this Chondricthyes is its very long snout that made up half of its body. The snout looks similar to that seen in the unrelated actinopterygian fish family Polyodontidae (Acipenseriformes). The body of Bandringa had two dorsal fins, a set of three lower fins (5 in total) and a long tapering Heterocercal caudal fin. Bandringa fed by suction feeding, and using its long snout and needle like spines on its cheek for hunting in murky water.

Bandringa had a long rostrum and may have been analogous to modern sawfish. It appears to have fed via suction feeding. Preserved gut contents include articulated arthropods. Although Bandringa is originally described as Ctenacanthiformes, its relationships to other elasmobranchs is currently unclear.

Breeding 
Bandringa is one of the few fossil fish that has a well studied breeding cycle. A paper found that the fish lived a lifestyle that was the opposite of salmon, with the adults living in freshwater areas and the younger ones living in more brackish and saltwater areas, and when fully grown would swim back into the freshwater areas. This makes sense because at the time, the area of Illinois where Bandringa specimens have been found was a diagonally running stream that ran from freshwater to saltwater areas.

References

Elasmobranchii
Prehistoric cartilaginous fish genera
Fossil taxa described in 1969